The Benevides Formation is a geologic formation in Texas and Mexico. It preserves fossils dating back to the Cretaceous period.

See also 

 List of fossiliferous stratigraphic units in Texas
 List of fossiliferous stratigraphic units in Mexico
 Paleontology in Texas

References

External links 
 

Geologic formations of Texas
Cretaceous geology of Texas
Geologic formations of Mexico
Cretaceous Mexico